The Tommy Murphy Cup 2006 began on July 22, 2006.  It was the third year that this element of the Bank of Ireland Football Championship was played.

Results

References

Tommy Murphy Cup
Tommy Murphy Cup